Heart of a Woman or The Heart of a Woman may refer to:

Books
The Heart of a Woman, a 1981 autobiography by Maya Angelou
The Heart of a Woman, or A True Woman, a 1911 novel by Baroness Orczy
Heart of a Woman, a 1912 poetry collection by Georgia Douglas Johnson

Film and TV
Heart of a Woman, or Kalb el mar'a, a 1940 film starring Amina Rizk
The Heart of a Woman, a 1920 film starring Mignon Anderson

Music
Heart of a Woman (album), a 1999 album by Etta James
The Heart of a Woman (album), a 1974 album by Johnny Mathis
The Heart of a Woman, a 2000 album by Kathie Lee Gifford

See also
 A Woman's Heart (disambiguation)
 From the Heart of a Woman, a 1981 album by Koko Taylor
 "In the Heart of a Woman", a 1993 song by Billy Ray Cyrus